Isabel Domingos Jorge, simply known as Isabel, is a Mozambican footballer who plays for the Mozambique women's national team.

International career
Isabel capped for Mozambique at senior level during the 2020 CAF Women's Olympic Qualifying Tournament (first round).

International goals
Scores and results list Mozambique's goal tally first

References

Living people
Mozambican women's footballers
Mozambique women's international footballers
Year of birth missing (living people)
Women's association footballers not categorized by position